ICS may refer to:

Computing
 Image Cytometry Standard, a digital multidimensional image file format used in life sciences microscopy
 Industrial control system, computer systems and networks used to control industrial plants and infrastructures
 Information and computer science, the combined field of informatics and computing
 Internet chess server, an external server that provides the facility to play, discuss, and view chess over the Internet
 Internet Connection Sharing, a feature in Microsoft operating systems since the advent of Windows 98 Second Edition
 .ics, a filename extension for iCalendar files
 Android Ice Cream Sandwich, the codename for version 4.0 of the Android operating system

Education
 Donald Bren School of Information and Computer Sciences, Irvine, California, United States
 Graduate School of International Corporate Strategy, Tokyo, Japan
 Indian Central School, Singapore
 Institute for Christian Studies, Toronto, Ontario
 Institute of Cornish Studies, in Falmouth, UK
 Inter-Community School Zürich, Switzerland
 Intermountain Christian School, Utah, United States
 International Christian School (Hong Kong)
 International Community School (Kirkland, Washington)
 International Community School (Singapore)
 International Community School (Thailand)
 International Community School (UK)
 International Community School of Addis Ababa
 International Correspondence Schools
 Islesboro Central School

Entertainment
 International Channel Shanghai, a foreign-language cable channel
 Immigration And Customs Security, a fictional organization in the Canadian TV series The Border

Music
 ICS Vortex, alias of Simen Hestnæs, Norwegian rock musician
 Immersion Composition Society, a network of composers, based in the USA

Organizations
 ICS Africa
 Imperial Civil Service
 Indian Civil Service (British India)
 Indian National Congress (Socialist)
 Institute of Chartered Shipbrokers
 International Communist Seminar
 Institute for Computational Sustainability, a Cornell-based institute in the United States
 International Chamber of Shipping
 International Citizen Service, a UK volunteer organization
 International Commission on Stratigraphy, the largest scientific body within the International Union of Geological Sciences
 International Continence Society, a multidisciplinary membership society for medical professionals concerned with incontinence
 Irish Computer Society, the national body for Information and Communication Technology (ICT) Professionals in Ireland
 Integrated care system, a component of the National Health Service (England)

Science
 Inhaled corticosteroid, steroid hormones used to treat the nasal mucosa, sinuses, bronchi, and lungs
 Intercostal space, the space between two ribs

Technology
 Ganz CSMG, also known as Ganz ICS, a Hungarian tram type
 In Channel Select, a technology improving programme reception in FM tuners
 Industrial control system
 International Classification for Standards, an international classification system for technical standards
 International Code of Signals, a maritime signaling standard also abbreviated INTERCO

Other uses
 Incident Command System, an emergency response management system
 InterCity Slovenia, a premium train service in Slovenia
 Israeli Cassini Soldner, a historical geographic coordinate system
 Investor court system
 Inmate Calling Service, a type of specialized telephone service provisioned for use by inmates at correctional facilities
 International Code of Signals, an international system of signals and codes for use in navigation and related matters

See also 
 Ic (disambiguation)